The Diocese of Central Zimbabwe is one of 15 dioceses within the Anglican Church of the Province of Central Africa. It came into being in 1971 and the current bishop is The Revd Ignatius Makumbe. The Cathedral is that of St. Cuthbert, Shurugwi Road, Gweru, of which the Dean is The Very Revd E. Basvi .

References

Central Zimbabwe
Christian organizations established in 1971
1971 establishments in Rhodesia